State Route 827 (SR 827) is a state highway in Lyon County, Nevada. The road starts at SR 339 and heads east as Mason Road. It continues east across SR 208 and is renamed West Cremetti Lane, then turns south as MacKenzie Lane, and then turns east again onto East Pursel Lane. The highway then turns into a gravel county road.

Major intersections

References

827